Cetate is a commune in Bistrița-Năsăud County, Transylvania, Romania. It is composed of three villages: Orheiu Bistriței, Petriș (Petres; Petersdorf), and the commune center, Satu Nou (Felsőszászújfalu; Oberneudorf). It also included three other villages until 2002, when they were split off to form Dumitrița Commune.

It lies in the historic region of Nösnerland, a region centered between the Bistrița and Mureș rivers. 

Cetate is situated in a hilly area at the eastern edge of the Transylvanian Plateau.

See also
Castra of Orheiu Bistriței
Dacian fortress of Monariu

References

Communes in Bistrița-Năsăud County
Localities in Transylvania